Thorpe on the Hill railway station was a station serving the village of Thorpe-on-the-Hill, Lincolnshire, England.

Opening
It was opened as Thorpe on 4 August 1846 by the Midland Railway when it opened the Nottingham to Lincoln Line.

The station building was to the south of the two running lines on the east side of Station Road which was crossed by a level crossing, there were two platforms and a small goods yard to the north east able to accommodate most types of goods including live stock.

Services

The station was renamed to Thorpe on the Hill on 1 October 1890.

There were still two trains each way on Sundays.

In 1947 the London, Midland and Scottish Railway service comprised six services in each direction to either Nottingham or Lincoln with one extra Saturday service through to Derby, there were three Sunday trains to Lincoln but only two back.

Closure
The station closed for passengers on 7 February 1955 and freight on 15 June 1964.

The line through the station site is still open.

References

Notes

Citations

Bibliography

Further reading

External links

 Thorpe on the Hill station on navigable 1947 O. S. map

Disused railway stations in Lincolnshire
Former Midland Railway stations
Railway stations in Great Britain opened in 1846
Railway stations in Great Britain closed in 1955